FACIT EDB was a vacuum tube based computer that was manufactured by Åtvidabergs Industrier AB after the designs for BESK, that had been developed by the Swedish Board for Computing Machinery (Matematikmaskinnämnden).

FACIT EDB was the first fully Swedish series production computer. EDB stod for "Electronic Computer Processing". The manufacturing was done by Åtvidabergs Industrier department of electronics in Stockholm and came to fruition by recruiting 18 key persons from the Swedish Board for Computing Machinery (Matematikmaskinnämndens). Internally nicknamed "the Besk boys". In 1960 the department became Facit Electronics with a new factory in Solna. The recruitment of people from Swedish Board for Computing Machinery were approved by the Finance minister Gunnar Sträng. That thought that production of computers was not something the government should be involved in.  In 1963 a FACIT EDB-3 was installed at National Defence Radio Establishment (FRA) which enabled use at any time of the day.

History 
In 1956 Åtvidabergs industrier recruited seventeen people from the Swedish Board for Computing Machinery that had developed the BESK computer. The same year the company bought the designs drawings for BESK and the first copy were  inaugurated in October 1957. It had some improvements, like the double amount of magnetic-core memory, later came a new advanced magnetic tape memory, the carousel memory.

FACIT EDB was installed as a service machine in Åtvidaberg industries facilities at Karlavägen in Stockholm.  It meant that customers could come and run their own programs for payment per the hour. The machine became heavily used, the need for calculations existed among others in meteorology.

Operation 
FACIT EDB were like the BESK computer a so called IAS machine. The original IAS-machine were completed at Massachusetts Institute of Technology (MIT) in 1951. FACIT EDB were programmed by loading a program into the working memory, were also in- and output data could be stored.  IAS-machines weren't software compatible, but build on drawings of the original IAS-machine architecture.

FACIT EDB was a copy of the BESK, and was built with a combination of electron tubes and germanium diodes.  The programs were fitted with break points so that the calculation could be resumed after som electron tube had burnt out and been replaced.  As working memory a ferrite core was used.

Input- and output units were:
 Paper tape reader (in) 500-1000 characters/second. 5-8 channel strip.
 Magnetic tape, carousel memory from 1958, (in and out)
 Typewriter (out) circa 10 characters/second.
 Paper tape puncher (out) circa 150 characters/second.
 Teleprinter (out) 11 rows/second, 160 characters/row.
 Control panel (in and out).

Software and programs for the machine was among others an ALGOL compiler, machine code compiler and operating system.  The machine could also run various standard programs meant for BESK.

References

External links 
 kth.diva-portal.org: Att arbeta med 1950-talets matematikmaskiner: Transkript av ett vittnesseminarium vid Tekniska museet i Stockholm den 12 september 2005 (English: to work with 1950s mathematical machines: Transcript of a witness seminar at Museum of Technology in Stockholm)
 tekniskamuseet.se: Datorer och program för kristallografiska beräkningar 1950-1980, minnesberättelse av Rune Liminga och Ivar Olovsson, 2011 (English: computers and programs for calculations on crystallography 1950-1980, a memory tale by Rune Liminga and Ivar Olovsson, 2011)

Information technology in Sweden
Swedish inventions